Benay Venuta (born Benvenuta Rose Crooke, January 27, 1910 – September 1, 1995) was an American actress, singer and dancer.

Early life

Born in San Francisco, Venuta was a graduate of Hollywood High School. She attended finishing school in Geneva and lived in London where she worked as a dancer before returning to the States.

Her father was English, and her mother was Swiss-Italian.

Film
Venuta made her first screen appearance in the silent Trail of '98 in 1928. She also appeared in Repeat Performance (1947), Annie Get Your Gun (1950, as Dolly Tate), Call Me Mister (1951), and Bullets over Broadway (1994).

The finale of Call Me Mister is a production number of “Love is Back in Business” staged by Busby Berkeley, ending with four leading players on a precarious, high-rising disc surrounded by water fountains.  Venuta is replaced here by a lookalike in the same clothes.  Asked in the 1970s about this, she explained:  “Betty Grable said, ‘I’m the star.  I gotta do it.’  Dan Dailey was so drunk he didn’t care what he was doing.  Danny Thomas said, ‘I’m on the way up.  I gotta do it.’   Well, I didn’t gotta do it.”

Stage
Venuta made her Broadway debut when she replaced Ethel Merman in the lead role of Reno Sweeney in Cole Porter's Anything Goes in 1935. The two remained close friends and co-starred in a revival of Annie Get Your Gun in 1966. Additional Broadway credits included By Jupiter (1942), Hazel Flagg (1953), and Romantic Comedy (1979).

Venuta's summer stock and regional theatre credits included A Little Night Music, Bus Stop, Gypsy, Come Blow Your Horn, Auntie Mame, The Prisoner of Second Avenue, Little Me, and Pal Joey.

Television
In 1958, Venuta was cast as private eye Bertha Cool in a television pilot for a series to be called Cool and Lam, based on the novels by Erle Stanley Gardner writing as A. A. Fair, but the pilot remains the only episode in existence.

Television audiences knew her as Jean Smart's prim and proper mother-in-law Ellen Stillfield in the sitcom Designing Women.

She also appeared on That Girl in a 1968 episode titled, "The Seventh Time Around," as Lady Margaret "Trixie" Weatherby.

Radio
Venuta's Benay Venuta Hour "was a popular CBS radio program." She was a vocalist on such shows as Freddie Rich's Penthouse Party, Duffy's Tavern and Take a Note. In 1948, she was the host of Keep Up with the Kids, a Mutual radio quiz show in which celebrity parents (Roddy McDowall, Penny Singleton, Pat O'Brien) competed against their children.

Personal life
Venuta married Kenneth Kelley on October 20, 1935, in Ossining, New York. They were divorced on November 29, 1939. She had two daughters, Patty and Deborah, from her second marriage to film producer Armand Deutsch. She was married to character actor Fred Clark from 1952 to 1962. She died from lung cancer in New York City on September 1, 1995, at age 84.

Date of birth and age at death
Several sources have given Venuta's birthdate as January 27, 1911. In her obituary, published in  The New York Times, her birthdate is listed as 1911, indicating she died at age 84. However, both the California Birth Index and the United States Census show her birth at 1910, which would make her 85 in 1995, at the time of her death.

References

External links

1911 births
1995 deaths
American female dancers
Dancers from California
American expatriate actresses in the United Kingdom
American stage actresses
American film actresses
American radio personalities
American television actresses
American people of English descent
American people of Swiss-Italian descent
Actresses from San Francisco
Deaths from lung cancer in New York (state)
20th-century American actresses
20th-century American singers
American expatriates in Switzerland
20th-century American women singers
Rosenwald family
20th-century American dancers